1986 Ashes series may refer to:
The Ashes series contested whilst the English cricket team in Australia in 1986–87
The Ashes series contested during the 1986 Kangaroo tour of Great Britain and France